2012 TBL Playoffs was the final phase of the 2011–12 Turkish Basketball League. The playoffs started on 5 April 2012.
Fenerbahçe Ülker were the defending champions.

The eight highest placed teams of the regular season qualified for the playoffs. In the quarter-finals a best-of-three was played, in the semi-finals a best-of-five and in the finals a best-of-seven playoff format was used.

Beşiktaş Milangaz competed against Anadolu Efes in the finals, won the series 4-2 and got their 2nd championship.

Bracket

Quarterfinals

Galatasaray Medical Park vs. Tofaş

Beşiktaş Milangaz vs. Fenerbahçe Ülker

Banvit vs. Aliağa Petkim

Anadolu Efes vs. Pınar Karşıyaka

Semifinals

Galatasaray Medical Park vs. Beşiktaş Milangaz

Banvit vs. Anadolu Efes

Finals

Anadolu Efes vs. Beşiktaş Milangaz

References

TBL.org.tr
TBLStat.net

Playoff
Turkish Basketball Super League Playoffs